Albrechtsberg an der Großen Krems is a town in the district of Krems-Land in the Austrian state of Lower Austria.

Population

Twin towns
Albrechtsberg an der Großen Krems is twinned with:

  Římov, Czech Republic

References

Cities and towns in Krems-Land District